Reilly Center, previously known as University Center, is a 5,480-seat multi-purpose arena, in St. Bonaventure, New York, United States.  It is home to the St. Bonaventure University Bonnies men's and women's basketball teams.  The arena opened in 1966 and is named for Carroll "Mike" Reilly, who coached both varsity football and basketball at the university.

In 2007, the playing surface was named "Bob Lanier Court" in honor of former Bonnies and NBA great Bob Lanier, who led the Bonnies to the Final Four in 1970.

It is the third-largest basketball arena in Western New York (behind the over 18,000 seats in KeyBank Center and the 6,100 seats in Alumni Arena at the University at Buffalo North Campus) and has the highest seating capacity of any sports venue in Cattaraugus County and the western Southern Tier.

In 2001, the facility was named one of the five toughest places to play in college basketball by ESPN's Jay Bilas.

See also
 List of NCAA Division I basketball arenas

References

External links
 Description

College basketball venues in the United States
Indoor arenas in New York (state)
St. Bonaventure Bonnies basketball
Sports venues in New York (state)
Sports venues in Cattaraugus County, New York
1966 establishments in New York (state)
Sports venues completed in 1966